Angada (Sanskrit: अङ्गदः, IAST: Aṅgada) is a legendary vanara in Hinduism. He helps Rama find his wife Sita and fight her abductor, Ravana, in the epic Ramayana. He is the prince of Kishkindha, and is later crowned as the kingdom's monarch.

Legend 
Angada is a son of the powerful vanara king Vali, and his wife Tara. He is the nephew of Sugriva. After Rama and Sugriva kill his father, Angada joins Rama's forces to rescue Sita from Ravana's captivity.

Angada and Tara are instrumental in reconciling Rama and his brother, Lakshmana, with Sugriva, after the king fails to fulfill his promise to help Rama find and rescue his wife. Together, they are able to convince Sugriva to honour his pledge to Rama, instead of spending his time carousing and drinking. Sugriva then arranges for vanaras to help Rama and organises the monkey army that will battle Ravana's demonic host. Angada leads the particular search party, which consists of Hanuman and Jambavanta and is able to find Sita, Rama's wife.

A legend goes by that no one could move Angada's leg. Just before the war, Rama sends Angada to Ravana's court as a peace messenger to give him one last chance to send Sita back to him and stop the war. Angada travels to Ravana's court, and issues him a last warning but Ravana retorts by stating that his father, Vali, is his friend. Angada, however, rejects Ravana's stance, and retorts by saying that there was nothing as divine as serving Rama, and then proceeds to mock Ravana for his foolishness and pride, in front of the entire court. He challenges the present courtiers to move his leg, upon which he promises that he would retreat from the island, forgetting about rescuing Sita. Almost all courtiers take turns to move his leg, but fail to even give it a budge. Even Indrajita, the most powerful son of Ravana, is unable to move the leg. Seeing Indrajita defeated, Ravana rises in fury, and proceeds to accept the challenge, upon which Angada moves his leg out of the way, and Ravana's crown falls off.  When the king reaches for his crown, Angada rhetorically wonders why Ravana wishes to touch his leg, and that touching the feet of Rama would be much more fruitful instead. He hurls the crown with such force that it is supposed to have landed at Rama's feet. The prince flies away before Ravana could seize him. Rama is pleased by this act of Angada.

In the Battle of Lanka that ensues, Angada slays many great warriors from Lanka, including, Ravana's son Narantaka, and the chief general of Ravana's army, Mahaparshva.

Angada marries the eldest daughter of the vanara Mainda, and has a son, Dhruva.

When his uncle Sugriva decides to retire from the earth and return to his father, Surya, he crowns Angada as the next king of Kishkindha, and of the vanaras.

References

External links
http://mythfolklore.net/india/encyclopedia/angada.htm

Vanara in the Ramayana
Characters in the Ramayana